Ernst Olof Eklund (6 August 1882 – 3 August 1971) was a Swedish film actor and theatre director.
He appeared in 40 films between 1914 and 1962 and was also the director of six different theatres.

Biography
Eklund was born at Östervåla in Uppsala County, Sweden. He began playing amateur theater in Gävle.  During his career he was director of several theaters: Blancheteatern 1917–1926,  Comediteatern  1923–1938, Konserthusteatern 1926–1927,  Skansenteatern  1934–1940, Oscarsteatern  1938–1941 and  Lisebergsteatern  in Gothenburg 1947–1956.

He was married to actress and theatre director Alice Eklund (1896–1983), daughter of actress Anna Hofman-Uddgren (1868–1947) and screenwriter  Karl Gustaf Uddgren (1865–1927). He was the father of actor Nils Eklund (born 1927).

Partial filmography

 The Strike (1914)
 Fru Kristina (1917) - Franz Herder
 Søster Karin (1917) - Martin Falk
 Moderens Øjne (1917) - Carl Lind - Povl's Father / Povl as Adult
 Jefthas dotter (1919) - Runo Procope
 Ödets redskap (1922) - Augustus Ferrer
 A Stolen Waltz (1932) - Allan Dehner
 En natt på Smygeholm (1933) - Major Hector
 En stilla flirt (1934) - Gunnar Green
 The Song to Her (1934) - Harry Händel
 Under False Flag (1935) - Karl Hammar
 Poor Millionaires (1936) - Georg Delmar
 Johan Ulfstjerna (1936) - Prof. Stenback
 The Lady Becomes a Maid (1936) - Karl-Axel Allard
 Milly, Maria och jag (1938) - Prof. Klintberg
 Variety Is the Spice of Life (1939) - Uncle Ludvig
 Bright Prospects (1941) - Helge Dahlberg
 Fröken Kyrkråtta (1941) - Col. Lindberg
 Hemtrevnad i kasern (1941) - Col. Justus Tamm
 Dangerous Ways (1942) - Katena
 Tomorrow's Melody (1942) - Wassberg
 We House Slaves (1942) - Teodor Larsson
 Jacobs stege (1942) - Olsson
 It Is My Music (1942) - Georg Welander
 Flickan är ett fynd (1943) - Pontus Axelsson
 Young Blood (1943) - Major Björn Lindemark
 Älskling, jag ger mig (1943) - Thomas Berg
 Live Dangerously (1944) - Professor Fors
 The Green Lift (1944) - Direktör Bang
 Maria of Kvarngarden (1945) - Major Lundgren
 Jagad (1945) - Ella's Father
 Brita in the Merchant's House (1946) - Grosshandlaren
 Crisis (1946) - Uncle Edvard
 Banketten (1948) - Jacob
 Vagabond Blacksmiths (1949) - Kilbom
 Café Lunchrasten (1954) - Editor-in-chief (uncredited)
 Seger i mörker (1954) - Bank Manager
 Så tuktas kärleken (1955) - The Doctor

References

External links
 

1882 births
1971 deaths
20th-century Swedish male actors
People from Heby Municipality
Swedish male film actors
Swedish male silent film actors